Za sklom is Slovak police procedural television series created by a program director of TV JOJ Roland Kubina and produced by DNA Production. Series debuted on 28 September 2016. On 13 January 2017, JOJ confirmed the second season, which premiered on 8 November 2017. On 17 July 2018 it was announced that the series was renewed for the third and final season, which is inspired by the murder of reporter Ján Kuciak and his fiancé Martina Kušnírová. The third season premiered on 1 October 2019.

Series overview

Episodes

Season 1 (2016)

Season 2 (2017–18)

Season 3 (2019)

References

External links 

 
 
 List of Za sklom episodes on SerialZone.cz

Za Sklom